The Auschwitz concentration camp was a complex of over 40 concentration and extermination camps built and operated by Nazi Germany in occupied Poland during World War II and the Holocaust.

Auschwitz may also refer to:

Places
 Oświęcim (German: Auschwitz), a Polish town after which the concentration camp was named
 Duchy of Oświęcim, a historical division of Silesia

Arts, entertainment and media
 Auschwitz (film), 2011 
 Auschwitz: The Nazis and 'The Final Solution', a 2005 TV documentary 
 "Auschwitz" (song), a 1966 song by Francesco Guccini, performed by Equipe 84
 Auschwitz: A Doctor's Eyewitness Account, a 1961 book by Miklos Nyiszli

See also